A  is a type of partnership under German and German-influenced maritime law for the joint ownership of a merchant vessel. This form of ownership is related to the Dutch  system that ultimately gave rise to joint-stock companies, and dates back to the Middle Ages.

As a system of business organization,  was very common in the Baltic Sea and in England in the 1870s.

German law

In 2013, changes to the German commercial code ( or HGB), barred the creation of new . Those still existing at that time were not required to reorganize.

Austrian law

After the fall of Nazi Germany, the Austrian legal system retained many influences from German law. On 1 January 2007, the Trade Law Amendment Act entered into force, preventing the formation of any more , but allowing those that existed previously to continue.

References

German business law
Law of Austria
Admiralty law
Partnerships
Shipping companies of Germany
Shipping companies of Austria
Types of business entity